The 103rd Street station is a local station on the IRT Lexington Avenue Line of the New York City Subway. Located at the intersection of Lexington Avenue and 103rd Street in East Harlem, it is served by the  train at all times, the <6> train during weekdays in the peak direction, and the  train during late nights.

This station was constructed as part of the Dual Contracts by the Interborough Rapid Transit Company and opened in 1918. It was renovated in 1990 and in 2015-2016.

History

Construction and opening 
Following the completion of the original subway, there were plans to construct a line along Manhattan's east side north of 42nd Street. The original plan for what became the extension north of 42nd Street was to continue it south through Irving Place and into what is now the BMT Broadway Line at Ninth Street and Broadway. In July 1911, the IRT had withdrawn from the talks, and the Brooklyn Rapid Transit Company (BRT) was to operate on Lexington Avenue. The IRT submitted an offer for what became its portion of the Dual Contracts on February 27, 1912.

In 1913, as part of the Dual Contracts, which were signed on March 19, 1913, the Public Service Commission planned to split the original Interborough Rapid Transit Company (IRT) system from looking like a "Z" system (as seen on a map) to an "H"-shaped system. The original system would be split into three segments: two north–south lines, carrying through trains over the Lexington Avenue and Broadway–Seventh Avenue Lines, and a west–east shuttle under 42nd Street. This would form a roughly "H"-shaped system. It was predicted that the subway extension would lead to the growth of the Upper East Side and the Bronx.

103rd Street station opened on July 17, 1918, with service initially running between Grand Central–42nd Street station and 167th Street via the line's local tracks. On August 1, the "H system" was put into place, with through service beginning on the new east and west side trunk lines, and the institution of the 42nd Street Shuttle along the old connection between the sides. The cost of the extension from Grand Central was $58 million.

Later years 

The city government took over the IRT's operations on June 12, 1940. This station was renovated in 1990.

The Downtown platform was renovated in 2015, with the placement of new white wall tiles, new floor tiles and benches. From January 26, 2016, to May 23, 2016, the Uptown platform was closed for renovation and was done in the same style as the Downtown platform. This was completed about a month earlier than planned.

Station layout 

This underground station has four tracks and two side platforms. The two center express tracks are used by the 4 and  trains during daytime hours. The 6 stops here at all times, and the 4 stops here during late nights.

All other stations between Grand Central–42nd Street and 125th Street on the line, except 110th Street, have the local tracks on an upper level and express ones on the lower level, with emergency exits provided at local stations for emergency egress.

Both platforms have their original trim line, which has "103" tablets on it at regular intervals, and name tablets, which read "103RD STREET" in the original mosaic. Prior to the 1990 station renovation, mosaic tiles were used so as to depict the 103rd Street mosaic as a sign hanging down from a horizontal support beam above. These "signholders" were covered over in 1990. An emergency phone is present immediately to the south of the southbound local platform.

The 1990 ceramic artwork here is called Neo-Boriken by Nitza Tufiño, based on the neighborhood's Caribbean and Latin American heritage. According to the accompanying plaque, P.R.O.M.I.S.E. (Puerto Rican Organization for Growth Research Education and Self Sufficiency) helped to fund the murals. This is one of two projects Tufiño made for MTA Arts & Design; the other, Westside Views – a community project for which she was the lead artist – can be found at 86th Street.

Exits
The station's only entrance/exit is a mezzanine above the platforms and tracks near the south end. It has two staircases from each platform, a waiting area that can be used as a crossover, turnstile bank, token booth, and two street stairs going up to the southeast and southwest corners of 103rd Street and Lexington Avenue. The mezzanine has mosaics indicating uptown and downtown directions. The fences surrounding each exit stairway are unusual as each section of the fence is at a different elevation, as they are located on Duffy's Hill, a sharp incline, on Lexington Avenue between 102nd and 103rd Streets.

References

External links 

 
 nycsubway.org — Neo-Boriken Artwork by Nitza Tufino (1990)
 Station Reporter — 4 Train
 Station Reporter — 6 Train
 MTA's Arts For Transit — 103rd Street (IRT Lexington Avenue Line)
 103rd Street entrance from Google Maps Street View
 Platforms from Google Maps Street View

IRT Lexington Avenue Line stations
New York City Subway stations in Manhattan
Railway stations in the United States opened in 1918
1918 establishments in New York City
East Harlem